The historic Town of Fairplay is the Statutory Town that is the county seat and the most populous municipality of Park County, Colorado,  United States. The town population was 724 at the 2020 United States Census. The town is the fifth-highest incorporated place in the State of Colorado. Fairplay is now a part of the Denver–Aurora–Lakewood, CO Metropolitan Statistical Area and the Front Range Urban Corridor.

History
A historic gold mining settlement, the town was founded in 1859 during the early days of the Pike's Peak Gold Rush. The town was named by settlers who were upset by the generous mining claims given to the earliest prospectors and promised a more equitable system for its residents. The town of Fairplay was incorporated in 1872.

It is the largest community in the grassland basin of Colorado known as South Park, sitting on the west edge of the basin at the junction of U.S. Highway 285 and State Highway 9. It is on a hillside just east of the Middle Fork South Platte River, near where Highway 9 ascends the river valley northward to Alma and Hoosier Pass. It is a quiet town, and the roads surrounding it have a low volume of traffic. Although it was founded during the initial placer mining boom, the mines in the area continued to produce gold and silver ore for many decades up through the middle of the 20th century.

The town consists of modern retail businesses along the highway, as well as a historic town on the bluff above the river along Front Street. The northern extension of Front Street along the river has been preserved and has become the site of relocated historic structures as an open-air museum called South Park City, intended to recreate the early days of the Colorado Gold Rush. Most of the residences in town are located on the hillside west of US Highway 285 and east of State Highway 9, in the vicinity of the schools and Park County Courthouse. The majority of the streets in town were finally paved in 2005.

The Town of Fairplay is the visual basis for the Town of South Park in the television series South Park. The people in the show are influenced by Boulder, Colorado, where creators Matt Stone and Trey Parker attended college at the University of Colorado.

Geography
As of the 2020 United States Census, the town had a total area of  including  of water.

Climate
Fairplay has a subarctic or subalpine climate (Koppen: Dfc) given its elevation, with short cool summers, and long, snowy, cold winters. Temperature ranges between day and night are large, due to the high elevation, low cloud cover, and dryness of the air.

Demographics

As of the census of 2000, there were 610 people, 259 households, and 169 families residing in the town. The racial makeup of the town was 93% White, 1.3% African American, 1.0% Native American, 0.3% Asian, 2.8% from other races, and 1.5% from two or more races. Hispanic or Latino of any race were 4.9% of the population.

There were 259 households, out of which 32% had children under the age of 18 living with them, 51% were married couples living together, 8% had a female householder with no husband present, and 34% were non-families. 26% of all households were made up of individuals, and 3.9% had someone living alone who was 65 years of age or older.  The average household size was 2.36 and the average family size was 2.8.

Approximately 24% of the town under the age of 18, 8% from 18 to 24, 37% from 25 to 44, 25% from 45 to 64, and 5% 65 years of age or older.  The median age was 35 years. For every 100 females, there were 110 males.  For every 100 females age 18 and over, there were 112 males.

The median income for a household in the town was $50,385, and the median income for a family was $51,980. Males had a median income of $34,290 versus $26,430 for females. The per capita income for the town was $21,740.  About 6.6% of families and 9.5% of the population were below the poverty line, including 10.4% of those under age 18 and 5.4% of those age 65 or over.

Arts and culture

Burro Days 
The Burro Days festival is held on the last weekend of July.  The event celebrates the town's mining heritage. The main feature of the festival is a 29-mile (46.7 km) burro race over rough terrain and approximately 3,000-ft (914 m) elevation gain from downtown Fairplay to the 13,000-ft (3962 m) summit of Mosquito Pass. Teams consist of one person and one burro.  The race takes about five hours to complete; first prize is $1,000. Previously, the first prize included an ounce of gold. There are several other burro races in Colorado, the most notable takes place in Leadville.

The Fairplay event is the World Championship of Burro Racing, an ultra-marathon and the longest burro race in the state.  For many years (in the 1960s and early 1970s) the Burro race took place from Leadville to Fairplay, or vice versa, crossing over Mosquito Pass. This followed the route that Father John Lewis Dyer of the Methodist Episcopal Church used for circuit riding and for carrying mail. With time, the rivalry between the two cities ended this cooperative endeavor.

Infrastructure

Transportation
Fairplay is part of Colorado's Bustang network. It is on the Gunnison-Denver Outrider line.

Notable people
 John J. Hoover, convicted murderer lynched by a mob in Fairplay in 1880.
 Sheldon Jackson, Presbyterian missionary who established what is now the South Park Community Presbyterian Church in Fairplay.

In popular culture

The town has become mildly famous in recent years as the town depicted in the South Park animated television series on Comedy Central. Although the geographical references contained in several episodes imply that Fairplay is the model for South Park, it is much smaller and more rustic than its fictional counterpart, which has a more suburban character.  Co-creator Trey Parker grew up in Conifer and went to high school in Evergreen, both of which are somewhat more affluent mountain communities immediately west of Denver in Jefferson County.  Co-creator Matt Stone lived in the Denver suburb of Littleton.

Because the town is a regional center of government and commerce, the term "South Park" has historically been used in the town in the naming of institutions and business, including South Park High School (the namesake of which appears in the series).  The elementary school is Edith Teter Elementary and the middle school is South Park Middle School.

Although the town of South Park is based upon the real life town of Fairplay, the latter is mentioned by Gerald Broflovski in the episode "Night of the Living Homeless" and described as "4 miles away" in "Jakovasaurs", which implies that it is a separate town in the show. The county seat offices in Fairplay are seen, though not mentioned by name, in the episode "Stanley's Cup". In "T.M.I." the Pissed Off and Angry Party invade a FedEx Office location which the news reporter reports as the Fairplay FedEx.

A South Park parallel to the Burro race can be found in the "Cow Days" episode.

See also

 List of municipalities in Colorado
 Front Range Urban Corridor

References

External links

 
 CDOT map of the Town of Fairplay
 South Park Chamber of Commerce

Towns in Park County, Colorado
Towns in Colorado
County seats in Colorado